The Cosmic Evolution Survey (COSMOS) is a Hubble Space Telescope (HST) Treasury Project to survey a two square degree equatorial field with the Advanced Camera for Surveys (ACS). The largest survey ever undertaken by HST, the project incorporates commitments from observatories around the world, such as the Very Large Array radio observatory, the European Space Agency's XMM-Newton satellite, and Japan's eight meter Subaru telescope. At the moment, more than 150 astronomers around the world actively contribute to the project.

The project's primary goal is to study the relationship between large scale structure (LSS) in the universe and dark matter, the formation of galaxies, and nuclear activity in galaxies. This includes careful analysis of the dependence of galaxy evolution on environment. 

The survey covers a field, often known as the COSMOS field, of 2 square degrees of  sky in the constellation Sextans. The centre of the field in j2000 coordinates is at Right Ascension 10:00:24 Declination 02:10:55

In 2007 they released the first 3D the dark matter map

See also 

 Dark Energy Survey

Gallery

References

Hubble Space Telescope
Sextans (constellation)